The 2010 Football League Trophy Final was the 27th final of the domestic football cup competition for teams from Football Leagues One and Two, the Football League Trophy. The final was played at Wembley Stadium in London on 28 March 2010. The match was contested between Carlisle United and Southampton. Southampton won the match 4–1 to give them their first silverware since winning the 1976 FA Cup.

Match details

References

External links
Football League official report
 

2010
Football League Trophy Final 2010
Football League Trophy Final 2010
2009–10 Football League
Football League Trophy Final
Football League Trophy Final
Events at Wembley Stadium